Tanzania competed in the 2007 All-Africa Games held at the Stade du 5 Juillet in the city of Algiers, Algeria.

Medal summary
Tanzania won a single silver medal. Martin Sulle was second to Deriba Merga of Ethiopia in the half-marathon with a time of 1:03:01.

Medal table

List of Medalists

See also
 Tanzania at the African Games

References

2007 in Tanzanian sport
Nations at the 2007 All-Africa Games
2007